Escherichia virus HK97, often shortened to HK97, is a species of virus that infects Escherichia coli and related bacteria. It is named after Hong Kong (HK), where it was first located. HK97 has a double-stranded DNA genome.

Assembly and maturation

The major capsid protein of HK97, called gp5, cross-links upon maturation to form a chain-mail like structure. While DNA is being packaged into the capsid, the capsid expands by nearly 5 nm and changes from spherical to icosahedral in shape.

The HK97 assembly pathway begins with self-assembly of gp5 into pentamers and hexamers. A protease, called gp4, cleaves gp5 at its N-terminus. Attachment of a portal protein, gp3, coupled with conformational changes leads to the formation of a prohead, or procapsid, which is the precursor to the mature capsid.
A scaffolding protein is not required for capsid assembly. However, studies on the effects of deleting the delta domain of the major capsid protein, or parts of it, indicate that it is essential for assembly.

References

Further reading
 Dr. Bob Duda's Publications
 Dr. Roger Hendrix's Publications

External links
 UniProt Taxonomy: Enterobacteria phage HK97

Siphoviridae